The Saturn Award for Best Thriller Film is an award presented to the best film in the thriller genre by the Academy of Science Fiction, Fantasy and Horror Films.

The Saturn Awards originally recognized thriller films with the Best Action, Adventure or Thriller Film award from 1994 to 2010, and then with the award for Best Horror or Thriller Film. When Best Horror or Thriller Film was reverted to its previous form as Best Horror Film in 2013, the award for Best Thriller Film was created.

Winners and nominees

2010s

2020s

References

External links
 Official Saturn Award website

Saturn Awards